Elroy Leon Face (born February 20, 1928), nicknamed The Bullpen Baron, is an American former professional baseball relief pitcher. During a 17-year Major League Baseball (MLB) career, he pitched primarily for the Pittsburgh Pirates. A pioneer of modern relief pitching, he was the archetype of what came to be known as the closer, and the National League's greatest reliever until the late 1960s, setting numerous league records during his career.

Face was the first major leaguer to save 20 games more than once, leading the league three times and finishing second three times; in 1959 he set the still-standing major league record for winning percentage with a minimum of 13 decisions (.947), and single-season wins in relief, with 18 wins against only one loss. He held the NL record for career games pitched (846) from 1967 until 1986, and the league record for career saves (193) from 1962 until 1982; he still holds the NL record for career wins in relief (96), and he held the league mark for career innings pitched in relief until 1983. On his retirement, Face ranked third in major league history in pitching appearances, behind only Hoyt Wilhelm and Cy Young, and second in saves behind Wilhelm. He holds the Pirates franchise records for career games (802) and saves (188).

Career
Originally signed by the Philadelphia Phillies as an amateur free agent in 1949, Face was twice drafted by Branch Rickey, first for the Brooklyn Dodgers before the 1951 season, and again in 1952 for Pittsburgh. He made his debut in April 1953 and set a modern Pirates record for games pitched (68) in 1956, leading the league and breaking the club mark of 59 set by Bill Werle in 1951. In 1957 he saved 10 games for the first time, finishing fifth in the NL. In 1958 the team finished in second place, the first time in his five years they had placed better than seventh. Face led the NL with 20 saves, and posted his best earned run average to date with a 2.89 mark. He achieved his success almost exclusively with the forkball, which he had learned from Yankees reliever Joe Page.

In 1959 Face posted an 18–1 record, including 17 victories in a row to begin the year after ending 1958 with five in a row; he did not surrender a run in the entire period from June 11 to July 12. He was named the Player of the Month for June after posting a 5–0 record with four saves and a 0.38 ERA. Face finished the year with an ERA of 2.70, and finished eighth in the MVP voting, although he did not receive any votes for the Cy Young Award that year. (At the time, only first-place votes were cast for the award.) His 18 relief wins remains the major league record, topping Jim Konstanty's previous mark of 16 set in 1950. Face's .947 winning percentage exceeded the previous record .938 (15–1), set by Johnny Allen in 1937. In 1960 he had his second 20-save season, placing second in the league with 24, which equaled the previous NL record as Lindy McDaniel set a new mark with 26. With the Pirates winning their first pennant since 1927, he also led the league in games again, tying his own team record of 68; the mark would be broken when teammate Pete Mikkelsen appeared in 71 games in 1966.

In the 1960 World Series against the New York Yankees, Face became the first pitcher to save three games in a single Series. Face entered Game 1 with runners on first and second and none out in the eighth inning, leading 6–2; he retired the side, striking out Mickey Mantle and Bill Skowron and getting Yogi Berra to fly out, before giving up a 2-run Elston Howard home run in the ninth but getting a game-ending double play for a 6–4 win. He came into Game 4 with two men on and one out in the seventh inning, leading 3–2, and retired all eight men he faced. In Game 5, he was again brought in with two men on and one out in the seventh, this time leading 4–2, and retired eight of the last nine batters, allowing only a walk to Mantle. In the final Game 7 he was brought in with two on and none out in the sixth inning, with a 4–1 lead which he surrendered via an RBI single by Mantle and a three-run home run by Berra. He settled down, however, retiring seven of the next eight batters before allowing another two-run rally with two out in the eighth for a 7–4 Yankee lead. The Pirates came back to score five runs in the bottom of the inning after Face was pulled for a pinch-hitter, and won the game and the Series in the bottom of the ninth on Bill Mazeroski's home run.

Selected an All-Star each year from 1959 to 1961, Face again led the NL with 17 saves in 1961. In 1962 he broke McDaniel's NL record with a career-high 28 saves (one short of Luis Arroyo's major league mark set the previous year), also posting a 1.88 ERA; Ted Abernathy would set a new record in 1965 with 31 saves. Face now had three 20-save seasons at a time when no other pitcher had more than one. Also in 1962, Face passed Clem Labine to take over the NL record with 95 career saves, and then broke Johnny Murphy's major league mark of 107. In 1963 he earned 16 saves; he then suffered two difficult seasons, picking up only four saves in 1964 with an ERA over 5.00, and earning no saves in 1965. In 1964, Hoyt Wilhelm took over the major league career saves record. But Face returned to save 18 games in 1966 and 17 in 1967, finishing second in the NL both years. In 1967, he passed Warren Spahn's mark of 750 to become the NL's all-time leader in games pitched; his record would stand until Kent Tekulve moved ahead of him in 1986.

After 43 appearances and 13 saves in 1968, Face's contract was sold to the Detroit Tigers on August 31, but he made only two scoreless appearances for Detroit. He signed as a free agent with the Montreal Expos in 1969, earning five saves in 44 games before ending his career. In a 16-season career, he posted a 104–95 record with a 3.48 ERA and 877 strikeouts in 1375 innings pitched and 848 games. His NL record of 193 saves was not broken until 1982, when Bruce Sutter passed him; Dave Giusti broke his Pirates single-season mark with 30 in 1971. Tug McGraw surpassed his league record for career innings in relief in 1983. Face's 802 games with the Pirates equalled Walter Johnson's total with the Washington Senators for the most by any pitcher with a single club; the record was broken by Trevor Hoffman of the San Diego Padres in 2007. Face saved 16 or more games seven times in an era when starting pitchers were more apt to remain in a game they were leading, and seven times had an ERA under 3.00 with at least 40 appearances.

During his baseball career, Face, in keeping with a family tradition extending back two generations, worked as a carpenter during the off-season. Following his retirement, this became his full-time occupation, and beginning in 1979, Face served as the carpentry foreman at Mayview State Hospital until his retirement in 1990. Since 1983 Face has resided in North Versailles, Pennsylvania. In February 1999, Face, along with Hall of Famer Steve Carlton, was admitted to the pitcher's wing — namely, the Pitchers' Wall of Great Achievement — of the Ted Williams Museum and Hitters Hall of Fame.

See also

 List of Major League Baseball annual saves leaders

Notes

References

Further reading

Articles

 Hernon, Jack. "Pirates Take Three Pitchers in Draft; Face, Hetki, Hall Taken By Rickey". The Pittsburgh Post-Gazette. December 2, 1952.
 AP Wirephoto. "Bobby Bragan, ElRoy Face and Bob Clemente Jubilate". Pittsburgh Sun-Telegraph. July 22, 1956.
 Hernon, Jack. "Cards Win In Tenth, 4-3. Hand Kline 15th Loss; Bucs Beat Selves On Basepaths; Ron Relieves Face in Ninth When Blister Bothers Roy". The Pittsburgh Post-Gazette. July 27, 1957.
 Esper, George (AP). "Fireman Face Puts Out 24th for Murtaugh". The Gettysburg Times. September 10, 1958.
 "Face Cuts Hand, Sidelined". The Pittsburgh Post-Gazette. May 21, 1959.
 Smith, Chester. "Second All-Star Game Cheapen s Spectacle; Making Event Road Show Will Rob Contest of Much of Its Glamour; Face-Clemente Rumors Fly". The Pittsburgh Press. June 4, 1959.
 Biederman, Lester J. "The Scoreboard: Face Laughs Off Rumors of Battle with Clemente; No Truth to Story Roberto Cut My Hand with Knife, Roy Says". The Pittsburgh Press. June 4, 1959.
 Smith, Chester. "June's Bustin' Out All Over So Watch for Developments; Brito and Marchetti a Hungry Pair of Ends". The Pittsburgh Press. June 7, 1959.
 Hernon, Jack. "Roamin' Around: A Few Lines About the Baron". The Pittsburgh Post-Gazette. June 13, 1959.
 McHugh, Roy. "The Press Box: Roy Face's Face Is Getting Familiar; He Has a Public". The Pittsburgh Press. June 30, 1959.
 Olan, Ben (AP; uncredited). "Pirates' Elroy No Mere 'Face' In the Crowd; He's Major League's Top Relief Artist". St. Petersburg Times. July 5, 1959. (A shorter version of this article was published under Olan's byline in The Milwaukee Sentinel.)
 Biederman, Lester J. "The Scoreboard: Here's Summary of 14 Straight Won By Roy Face". The Pittsburgh Press. July 19, 1959.
 Biederman, Lester J. "The Scoreboard: Roy Face Has Won 8 of 15 Games in Extra Innings". The Pittsburgh Press. August 11, 1959.
 Associated Press. "Face: Not Going to Lose". The Santa Cruz Sentinel. September 9, 1959.
 Abrams, Al. "Sidelights on Sports: Man Nine Feet Tall". The Pittsburgh Post-Gazette. December 18, 1959.
 "Face Wins Coveted Dapper Dan Award: Face Beats Out Haddix, Will Be Feted February 7". The Pittsburgh Post-Gazette. December 18, 1959.
 Livingston, Pat. "The Press Box: Philly Scribe Finds Delightful Turmoil in Buc Dressing Room; Roy Face Talks in Reverse". The Pittsburgh Press. April 30, 1960.
 UPI Wirephoto. "Pirate Leaders". Rocky Mountain Telegram. May 23, 1960.
 Heimbuecher, Ruth. "It's Relief To Have Handyman Face Around Home; Wife Jeanne Proud of Elroy's Carpentry, Pitching Talents". The Pittsburgh Press. June 29, 1960.
 Biederman, Lester J.. "The Scoreboard: It's Matter of Gripping Ball to Make It Do Fancy Things; Face, Friend, Law, Haddix, Green Demonstrate Styles". The Pittsburgh Press. July 3, 1960.
 Biederman, Lester J.. "Pirate Pitching Makes Difference: Bucs Gain All-Star Raves--Especially Friend, Face, Law". The Pittsburgh Press. July 12, 1960.
 Hernon, Jack. "Oh, My! How Sweet This Is! Bucs Beat Yanks, 3-2, To Even World Series; Law, Face and Virdon Standouts". The Pittsburgh Post-Gazette. October 10, 1960. pp. 1, 24 and 28.
 Terrell, Roy. "Seven Bold Bucs". Sports Illustrated. October 10, 1960.
 Cope, Myron. "Virdon 'Showing' Yanks' Casey". The Pittsburgh Post-Gazette. October 10, 1960. pp. 24 and 28 ("Icy-nerved Elroy Face...").
 Lawrence, David L. "Lawrence Casts Vote For Bucs' Face; Governor Also High in Praise of Manager Murtaugh for Strategy in Game". The Pittsburgh Post-Gazette. October 11, 1960.
 Hoak, Don. "Tiger Looks At Series: Tough Mr. Elroy Has 'Em Cowed". The Pittsburgh Post-Gazette. October 11, 1960. pp 22 and 24.
 Cope, Myron. "Roy Face Ready to Pitch Again; He'll Start if Needed, He Asserts". The Pittsburgh Post-Gazette. October 11, 1960. pp. 22 and 24.
 Abrams, Al. "Bucs' Smith, Face Make Vocal Hit". The Pittsburgh Post-Gazette. October 18, 1960.
 Latham, Roger. "Face Pitching In Business: Buc Reliever Buys Motel, Fishing Site". The Pittsburgh Press. June 18, 1961. Sect. 1, pp. 1 and 18.
 Biederman, Lester J.. "Roy Face Agrees to Small Pay Cut; Pirate Bullpen Baron 6-12 in '61, Pitched in 371 Games in Last 6 Years". The Pittsburgh Press. January 24, 1962.
 Abrams, Al. "Sidelights on Sports: Don't Count ElRoy Out". The Pittsburgh Post-Gazette. April 3, 1962.
 Babic, George. "Joe Page Helped Bullpen Baron: He Taught Him to Use and Control Forkball". The Pittsburgh Post-Gazette. April 10, 1962.
 Cope, Myron. "The Pitching Explosion in Paradise". Sports Illustrated. June 24, 1963.
 Brody, Tom C. "The Fork Ball and Roy Face". Sports Illustrated. June 24, 1963.
 Hernon, Jack. "Pirates Sign Roy Face At Salary Slash; 'Bullpen Baron' Finished 1963 With 3-9 Record". The Pittsburgh Post-Gazette. January 24, 1964.
 Cernkovic, Rudy (UPI). "Roy Face Swinging Hammer". The Beaver County Times. December 8, 1965.
 "Face Signs 13th Contract With Pirates: Knee Operation Extends Career of Relief Hurler". The Pittsburgh Post-Gazette. January 20, 1966.
 Feeney, Charley. "Mazeroski, Face Sign '67 Pacts". The Pittsburgh Post-Gazette. January 20, 1967.
 Feeney, Charley. "Face Retire? Not When One Feels Young At 39". The Pittsburgh Post-Gazette. February 25, 1967.
 Feeney, Charley. "Life 'Begins' for Face". The Pittsburgh Post-Gazette. February 20, 1968.
 Associated Press. "Tigers Buy Roy Face for Drive". The Spartanburg Herald-Journal. September 1, 1968.
 Feeney, Charley. "Face Becomes an Insurance Man (For Detroit's Pennant Hopes)". The Pittsburgh Post-Gazette. September 2, 1968. pp. 69 and 71.
 Willson, Brad. "Press Box: Tigers Bought $100,000 Worth of 'Insurance'". The Daytona Beach Morning Journal. September 6, 1968.
 Associated Press. "Roy Face Released by Tigers; Former Pirate Relief Pitcher Victim of Trim". The Pittsburgh Post-Gazette. April 4, 1969.
 "Long Wait Ends: Saga of Face's Move to Expos". The Pittsburgh Post-Gazette. April 28, 1969.
 Feeney, Charley. "ElRoy Wins 2nd In Tight Relief; Bunning Injured; Montreal Kayos Ron Kline, Comes From Behind for Win; Face Kills Threats in 8th, 9th". The Pittsburgh Post-Gazette. May 2, 1969.
 Abrams, Al. "Sidelights On Sports: The Face Nobody Wanted". The Pittsburgh Post-Gazette. July 9, 1969.
 "About Face: He's Gone". The Montreal Gazette. August 16, 1969.
 Abrams, Al. "Sidelights On Sports: Potpourri". The Pittsburgh Post-Gazette. June 25, 1970.
 Kiersh, Edward. "Ex-Buc Face Finds Carpentry Provides Relief (Where Have You Gone, Vince DiMaggio?)". The Pittsburgh Press. April 14, 1983.
 Shields, Nancy. "Baseball Lore: ElRoy Face strikes her as a savior, then and now". The Pittsburgh Post-Gazette. September 26, 2004.

Books
 Heiman, Jim (1990). When the Cheering Stops: Ex-Major Leaguers Talk About Their Game and Their Lives. New York, NY: MacMillan Publishing Company. pp. 171–185. .
 O'Brien, Jim (1993). "ElRoy Face: The Baron of the Bullpen". Maz and the '60 Bucs: When Pittsburgh And Its Pirates Went All the Way. Pittsburgh, PA: James P. O'Brien Publishing. pp.  296–297, 298–299, 300–301, 302–303, 304–305, 306–307, 308–309, 310–311, 312–313. .
 O'Brien, Jim (1994). "ElRoy Face: Always a carpenter at heart". Remember Roberto: Clemente Recalled By Teammates, Family, Friends and Fans. Pittsburgh, PA: James P. O'Brien Publishing. pp.  156–157, 158-159, 160-161, 162-163, 164-165, 166. .
 Shalin, Mike (2002). Out by a Step: The 100 Best Players Not in the Hall of Fame. Lanham, MD: Rowman & Littlefield Publishing. pp. 248–250. .
 Heyde, Jack (2004). "ElRoy Face: North Versailles, PA; April, 1999". Pop Flies and Line Drives: Visits with Players from Baseball's Golden Era. Victoria, BC: Trafford Publishing. pp. 65–67. .
 Neary, Kevin (2013). Closer: Major League Players Reveal the Inside Pitch on Saving the Game. Philadelphia, PA: Running Press. pp. 14–19. . 
 Finoli, David (2016). "Roy Face". The 50 Greatest Players in Pittsburgh Pirates History. Lanham, MD: Rowman & Littlefield Publishing. pp. 113–118. .

External links
, or Retrosheet
SABR BioProject Biography
"1960: The Last Pure Season", by Kerry Keene

1928 births
Living people
American expatriate baseball players in Canada
Baseball players from New York (state)
Bradford Blue Wings players
Bradford Phillies players
Detroit Tigers players
Fort Worth Cats players
Hawaii Islanders players
Major League Baseball pitchers
Montreal Expos players
National League All-Stars
New Orleans Pelicans (baseball) players
People from Stephentown, New York
Pittsburgh Pirates players
Pueblo Dodgers players
United States Army soldiers